Nicola Salerno, also known as Nisa (11 March 1910 – 22 May 1969) was an Italian lyricist. He formed a famous songwriting duo with Renato Carosone.

Career
Nicola Salerno was born in Naples, Italy.

His first hit was "Eulalia Torricelli" of 1947, about the unhappy love story between a wealthy girl from Forlì and a guy named Giosuè. Nisa put the whole team of songwriters in the lyrics, as heirs to the beautiful Eulalia: "Un castello lo dà a Nisa, un castello lo dà a Redi, un castello, ma il più bello, al maestro Olivieri lo dà" ("she gives one castle to Nisa, one castle to Redi, but the most beautiful ones goes to Maestro Olivieri").

Nisa and Carosone met in 1955. It was Mariano Rapetti, Ricordi record company's director - and father of lyricist Mogol - who suggested that they should work together to enter a radio contest. Nisa brought Carosone three texts to be set to music. One of them was titled Tu vuò fà l'americano. Carosone had an instant inspiration and started composing a boogie-woogie on the piano keyboard. It took just fifteen minutes to create Carosone's most famous song, that became a worldwide success.

Their most famous hits include "'O suspiro", "Torero", "Tu' vuo' fa' l'americano", "Caravan Petrol", "Pigliate 'na pastiglia" and "'O Sarracino".

Nisa worked also with other songwriters. Among his best-known lyrics are "Guaglione", winning song of the Festival of Naples in 1956, and "Non ho l'età", with which Gigliola Cinquetti won both the Sanremo Music Festival and the Eurovision Song Contest in 1964.

Besides writing lyrics, Nicola Salerno was also an illustrator. He was the author, for example, of cover designs for some Neapolitan music scores published between the 1920s and 1930s.

He died in Naples in 1969.

See too 
 We No Speak Americano

Italian songwriters
Male songwriters
Eurovision Song Contest winners
1910 births
1969 deaths
Musicians from Naples
20th-century Italian musicians
20th-century Italian male musicians
Lyricists